Dean Turner (born June 22, 1958 in Dearborn, Michigan and raised in Farmington Hills, Michigan) is a retired American professional ice hockey defenseman who played 35 games in the National Hockey League for the Colorado Rockies, New York Rangers, and Los Angeles Kings.

Career statistics

External links
 

1958 births
Living people
American men's ice hockey defensemen
Colorado Rockies (NHL) players
Fort Worth Texans players
Ice hockey players from Michigan
Los Angeles Kings players
Michigan Wolverines men's ice hockey players
New Haven Nighthawks players
New York Rangers draft picks
New York Rangers players
People from Farmington Hills, Michigan
Rochester Americans players
Sportspeople from Dearborn, Michigan
Springfield Indians players